Macvaughiella is a genus of Mesoamerican flowering plants in the tribe Eupatorieae within the family Asteraceae.

The genus is named in honor of the American botanist Rogers McVaugh (1909-2009) formerly of the University of Michigan.

 Species
 Macvaughiella chiapensis R.M.King & H.Rob. - El Salvador, Chiapas
 Macvaughiella mexicana (Sch.Bip.) R.M.King & H.Rob. - Veracruz , El Salvador, Oaxaca, Honduras, Chiapas

References

Asteraceae genera
Eupatorieae
Flora of North America